The African Society for Bioinformatics and Computational Biology (ASBCB) is a non-profit professional association dedicated to the advancement of bioinformatics and computational biology in Africa. Transformed from the African Bioinformatics Network (ABioNET), ASBCB was established in February 2004 at a meeting in Cape Town, South Africa. The Society serves as an international forum and resource devoted to developing competence and expertise in bioinformatics and computational biology in Africa. It complements its activities with those of other international and national societies, associations and institutions, public and private, that have similar aims. It also promotes the standing of African bioinformatics and computational biology in the global arena through liaison and cooperation with other international bodies.
It is an affiliated regional group of the International Society for Computational Biology (ISCB).

Vision 
The Society sees itself as conduit to promote the exchange of ideas, infrastructure and resources in the fields of bioinformatics and computational biology and facilitate the interaction and collaboration among scientists and educators around the world.
It also strives to measurably advance the awareness and understanding of the science of bioinformatics and computational biology. The society represents the bioinformatics and computational biology community in Africa and will be the most respected and reliable international non-profit organization representing this community.

Mission 
 Be a scholarly society dedicated to advancing, developing and promoting bioinformatics and computational biology in Africa.
 Serve a global membership by impacting government and scientific policies, providing high quality publications and meetings, and through distribution of valuable information about training, education, employment and relevant news from related fields.
 Develop the application of bioinformatics in Africa in collaboration with individuals, groups and organizations

Objectives 
 Identify, promote and establish opportunities for networking.
 Encourage and develop bioinformatics and computational biology nodes.
 Increase awareness and promote the use of bioinformatics and computational biology.
 Facilitate access to bioinformatics and computational biology infrastructure.
 Promote bioinformatics and computational biology education.

The Society also has good cooperation with the newly re-established African BIOinformatics NETwork (ABioNet). The ABioNET is in the process of development of a programme of training and research linking key sites of African Bioinformatics to provide regional capacity development.

References

External links
 ASBCB Website
 ASBCB Mailing List
 ISCB (International Society for Computational Biology)
 ABioNET Website
 EMBnet Website, EMBnet was created 1988

Organizations established in 2004
Biology organizations
Bioinformatics organizations
Professional associations based in Africa